Sepulcher Mountain, elevation , is a moderate mountain peak in northwest Yellowstone National Park halfway between the summit of Electric Peak and Mammoth Hot Springs. The peak was named Sepulcher by U.S. Army Captain John W. Barlow in 1871 because of its resemblance to a crypt when viewed from Gardiner, Montana.

The summit of Sepulcher Mountain can be reached by a  trail from the mouth of Clematis Creek at Mammoth Hot Springs.

Gallery

See also
 Mountains and mountain ranges of Yellowstone National Park

References

Mountains of Park County, Wyoming
Mountains of Yellowstone National Park
Mountains of Wyoming